Hoalid Regragui (born 23 September 1975), known as Walid Regragui, is a Moroccan professional football manager and former player who played as a right-back. He is the head coach of the Morocco national team. He made history when he led the team to the semi-finals of the FIFA World Cup 2022, the first African nation to do so.

Playing career
Born in Corbeil-Essonnes, Essonne, France, Regragui was a full international for Morocco. Clubs he played for include Toulouse, AC Ajaccio, Grenoble and Racing Santander. In the summer of 2009, he moved from Grenoble to Moroccan club Moghreb Tétouan.

Managerial career

Morocco 
After retiring as a player, Regragui started his football coaching career as the assistant coach of Morocco's national team in September 2012.

FUS 
On 8 May 2014, he landed a head coaching job with Fath Union Sport for the 2014–15 season. Following his league performances and Moroccan Throne Cup victory in 2014, he was named Mars d'Or Coach of the Year in March 2015.

On 22 January 2020, he left the club by mutual consent.

Wydad AC 
On 10 August 2021, Regragui was appointed as the head coach of Botola side Wydad AC. The team went on to win the 2021–22 Botola in his first season On 30 May 2022, he led Wydad AC to win its third CAF Champions League title, after beating defending champions Al Ahly in the final. He became only the second Moroccan manager to win the African Champions League, after Hussein Ammouta with Wydad in 2017. In December 2022, Regragui was nominated for the 2022 IFFHS World's Best Club Coach for his performance in the year in review with Wydad before becoming head coach of the Moroccan national team. He was subsequently adjudged the third best behind Carlo Ancelotti and Pep Guardiola.

Return to Morocco 
On 31 August 2022, Regragui was appointed as the new head coach for the Morocco national football team after the dismissal of former head coach Vahid Halilhodžić. Critics were unhappy with Regragui's appointment and derisively nicknamed him "avocado head". On 21 September 2022, Regragui coached his first friendly game, which ended in a 1–0 victory against Madagascar.

In the 2022 FIFA World Cup, he led Morocco to the knockout stage for the first time since 1986, and to the quarter finals after beating Spain on penalties in the round of 16, making Morocco the fourth African nation and the first Arab nation to qualify for this stage in a World Cup competition. Regragui himself is the first African manager, and first Arab manager to reach this stage. Morocco would later beat favourite Portugal 1–0 and move on to the semi-finals, not only another first for Morocco, but also making them the first African team, and first Arab team to qualify for the semi-finals. However, they lost to France in the semi-final 2–0 on 14 December. Afterward, they finished in fourth place with a 2–1 loss against Croatia. After the World Cup concluded, Regragui was nominated for the 2022 IFFHS World's Best National Coach award. He placed third behind World Cup winning coach Lionel Scaloni and runner-up Didier Deschamps.

Managerial statistics

Honours

Player
Ajaccio
Division 2: 2001–02

Morocco
Africa Cup of Nations runner-up: 2004
Individual

 Africa Cup of Nations Team of the Tournament: 2004

Manager
FUS
Botola: 2015–16
Moroccan Throne Cup: 2013–14

Al-Duhail
Qatar Stars League: 2019–20

Wydad AC 
Botola: 2021–22
CAF Champions League: 2021–22

Individual

 Mars d'Or Coach of the Year: 2014

Best Botola Coach of the Season: 2015–16, 2021–22

Order
 Officer of the Order of National Merit (Morocco): 2004
 Commander of the Order of National Merit (Morocco): 2016
 Commander of the Order of the Throne: 2022

References

External links

1975 births
Living people
People from Corbeil-Essonnes
Footballers from Essonne
French footballers
Moroccan footballers
Association football defenders
AS Corbeil-Essonnes (football) players
Racing Club de France Football players
Toulouse FC players
AC Ajaccio players
Racing de Santander players
Dijon FCO players
Grenoble Foot 38 players
Moghreb Tétouan players
Ligue 1 players
Ligue 2 players
La Liga players
Morocco international footballers
2004 African Cup of Nations players
2006 Africa Cup of Nations players
French football managers
Moroccan football managers
Wydad AC managers
Al-Duhail SC managers
Morocco national football team managers
Botola managers
2022 FIFA World Cup managers
French expatriate footballers
Moroccan expatriate footballers
Expatriate footballers in Spain
Moroccan expatriate sportspeople in Spain
French sportspeople of Moroccan descent